Jean-Barthélemot Sorbier, count, (1762–1827), was a French general of the Napoleonic Wars.

Revolutionary Wars
An aristocrat of the Ancien Régime, Sorbier joined the Royal Artillery Corps in 1782 and was a part of the La Fère regiment, where he met Napoleon Bonaparte. A captain in 1792, Sorbier is involved in the French Revolutionary Wars, taking part to the fighting in Northern France and on the Rhine. From September 1793 to April 1795, he was suspended, due to his aristocratic ascendancy. However, once he was reintegrated in the army, he was at once promoted to the rank of chef de brigade (colonel) and again was a part of the French Army of the Rhine, playing a remarkable part in the battle of Neuwied, on April 18, 1797. As a result, the commander-in-chief, general Lazare Hoche immediately promoted him to brigadier general on the field of battle. Three years later, in 1800, he became a general of division and general inspector of artillery.

Napoleonic Wars
In 1805, he was a part of the first Grande Armée and was present at the battle of Austerlitz, before taking the command of the artillery of the French 'Army of Italy'. In 1808, Napoleon I created Sorbier a count of the Empire. In 1809, he played an active role in the War of the Fifth Coalition, replacing general Jean Ambroise Baston de Lariboisière as commander of the Guard artillery, then, in 1812, was a part of the second Grande Armée during the Russian campaign, keeping his command of the Guard artillery. In 1813, Sorbier was named commander of the artillery of the Grande Armée, a command which he would retain during the 1814 campaign in France. During the Hundred Days, he joined Napoleon and after the downfall of the Emperor, Sorbier was exiled and then placed on the retirement list by King Louis XVIII.

Recognition

The name SORBIER is inscribed under the Arc de Triomphe, Eastern Pillar, 15th Column.

References

Sources
Fierro, Alfredo; Palluel-Guillard, André; Tulard, Jean - "Histoire et Dictionnaire du Consulat et de l'Empire”, Éditions Robert Laffont, 

French military personnel of the French Revolutionary Wars
French commanders of the Napoleonic Wars
Commanders in the French Imperial Guard
1762 births
1827 deaths
Names inscribed under the Arc de Triomphe